The 1856 Connecticut gubernatorial election was held on April 7, 1856. Incumbent governor and American Party nominee William T. Minor defeated former congressman and Democratic nominee Samuel Ingham and former Comptroller of Connecticut and Republican nominee Gideon Welles with 38.99% of the vote. 

In accordance with the national transition from the Second Party System to the Third Party System, this was the first such election in which the Republicans fielded a candidate, the last in which the Know-Nothings would run (and win), and the last in which the Whig Party participated.

Although Ingham won a strong plurality of the vote, he fell just short of a majority. As a result, the Connecticut General Assembly elected the governor, per the state constitution. Minor won the vote over Ingham, 135 to 116, in the General Assembly, and became the governor. This was the second election in which Ingham would receive a plurality of more than 10% and still lose, the first being 1854.

General election

Candidates
Major party candidates

William T. Minor, American or Know Nothing
Samuel Ingham, Democratic
Gideon Welles, Republican
John A. Rockwell, Whig

Results

References

1856
Connecticut
Gubernatorial